Puffin's Pla(i)ce was a Channel Islands children's television programme named after its star, Oscar Puffin, that was broadcast on ITV Channel Television on weekend afternoons (usually just before ITV News Channel TV). The programme, one of the longest-running children's series on the ITV network, had been broadcast since 3 March 1963.

Originally presented by Channel Television's team of continuity announcers, Puffin's Pla(i)ce presenters have included Stewart McDonald, Matthew Shaw, Kevin Pamplin, Sam Palmano, Lucy Anderson and Jenny Mullin.

In September 2013, it was announced that the show would no longer be broadcast on TV, but would move to an online format at the Channel Online website, but was quietly dropped soon after. The last TV edition was broadcast on 15 September 2013.

References

External links

1963 British television series debuts
1960s British children's television series
1970s British children's television series
1980s British children's television series
1990s British children's television series
2000s British children's television series
2010s British children's television series
2013 British television series endings
British television shows featuring puppetry
Channel Islands
English-language television shows
ITV children's television shows
Television shows produced by Channel Television